Chu Fu-sung (5 January 1915 – 14 June 2008) was a Taiwanese politician, who served as foreign minister from December 19, 1979 until April 22, 1987. Chu died on June 14, 2008 at the age of 93.

External links 
 Rulers.org: June 2008 in review

1915 births
2008 deaths
Taiwanese Ministers of Foreign Affairs
People from Xiangyang
Republic of China politicians from Hubei